Elections to provincial, municipal, city, county and district people's assemblies were held in North Korea on July 29, 2007.

27,390 provincial, municipal, city, county and district people's assembly deputies were elected.

Voter turnout was reported as 99.82%, with candidates receiving a 100% approval rate.

References

2007 in North Korea
2007 elections in Asia
Local elections in North Korea